Vincent William Oswald Barker (31 July 1876 – 2 December 1937) was an Australian politician.

He was born in Rosegarland in Tasmania. In 1912 he was elected to the Tasmanian House of Assembly as a Labor member for Denison, serving until his retirement in 1916. Barker died in Hobart in 1937.

References

1876 births
1937 deaths
Australian Labor Party members of the Parliament of Tasmania
Members of the Tasmanian House of Assembly